The men's 200 metres event at the 2013 Summer Universiade was held on 9–10 July.

Medalists

Results

Heats
Qualification: First 3 in each heat and 2 best performers advanced to the quarterfinals.

Wind:Heat 1: -0.2 m/s, Heat 2: ? m/s, Heat 3: -0.3 m/s, Heat 4: 0.0 m/s, Heat 5: +0.5 m/sHeat 6: +1.1 m/s, Heat 7: +0.8 m/s, Heat 8: +1.1 m/s, Heat 9: +1.1 m/s, Heat 10: +1.1 m/s

Quarterfinals
Qualification: First 3 in each heat and 4 best performers advanced to the Semifinals.

Wind:Heat 1: +0.1 m/s, Heat 2: +1.7 m/s, Heat 3: +0.8 m/s, Heat 4: +0.4 m/s

Semifinals
Qualification: First 4 in each heat advanced to the Final.

Wind:Heat 1: +2.2 m/s, Heat 2: +2.9 m/s

Final
Wind: +2.4 m/s

References 

200
2013